In Anglican Christianity, low church refers to those who give little emphasis to ritual. The term is most often used in a liturgical sense, denoting a Protestant emphasis, whereas "high church" denotes an emphasis on ritual, often Anglo-Catholic.

The term was initially pejorative. During the series of doctrinal and ecclesiastic challenges to the established church in the 17th century, commentators and others—who favoured the theology, worship, and hierarchical structure of Anglicanism (such as the episcopate) as the true form of Christianity—began referring to that outlook (and the related practices) as "high church", and by the early 18th century those theologians and politicians who sought more reform in the English church and a greater liberalisation of church structure, were in contrast called "low church".

Historical use
The term low church was used in the early part of the 18th century as the equivalent of the term Latitudinarian in that it was used to refer to values that provided much latitude in matters of discipline and faith. The term was in contradistinction to the term high church, or high churchmen, which applied to those who valued the exclusive authority of the Established Church, the episcopacy and the sacramental system.

Low churchmen wished to tolerate Puritan opinions within the Church of England, though they might not be in agreement with Puritan liturgical practices. The movement to bring Separatists, and in particular Presbyterians, back into the Church of England ended with the Act of Toleration 1689 for the most part.  Though Low church continued to be used for those clergy holding a more liberal view of Dissenters, the term eventually fell into disuse.

Both terms were revived in the 19th century when the Tractarian movement brought the term "high churchman" into vogue. The terms were again used in a modified sense, now used to refer to those who exalted the idea of the Church as a catholic entity as the body of Christ, and the sacramental system as the divinely given means of grace. A low churchman now became the equivalent of an evangelical Anglican, the designation of the movement associated with the name of Charles Simeon, which held the necessity of personal conversion to be of primary importance.

At the same time, Latitudinarian changed to broad church, or broad churchmen, designating those who most valued the ethical teachings of the Church and minimised the value of orthodoxy. The revival of pre-Reformation ritual by many of the high church clergy led to the designation ritualist being applied to them in a somewhat contemptuous sense. However, the terms high churchman and ritualist have often been wrongly treated as interchangeable. The high churchman of the Catholic type is further differentiated from the earlier use of what is sometimes described as the "high and dry type" of the period before the Oxford Movement.

Modern use
In contemporary usage, "low churches" place more emphasis on the Protestant nature of Anglicanism than broad or high churches and are usually Evangelical in their belief and conservative (although not necessarily traditional) in practice. They may tend to favour liturgy such as the Common Worship over Book of Common Prayer, services of Morning and Evening Prayer over the Eucharist, and many use the minimum of formal liturgy permitted by church law. The Diocese of Sydney has largely abandoned the Prayer Book and uses free-form evangelical services. 

Some contemporary low churches also incorporate elements of charismatic Christianity.

More traditional low church Anglicans, under the influence of Calvinist or Reformed thought inherited from the Reformation era, reject the doctrine that the sacraments confer grace ex opere operato (e.g., baptismal regeneration) and lay stress on the Bible as the ultimate source of authority in matters of faith necessary for salvation. They are, in general, prepared to cooperate with other Protestants on nearly equal terms. Some low church Anglicans of the Reformed party consider themselves the only faithful adherents of historic Anglicanism and emphasise the Thirty-Nine Articles of the Church of England as an official doctrinal statement of the Anglican tradition.

Ecumenical relationships

United churches with Protestants in Asia
Several provinces of the Anglican Communion in Asia have merged with Protestant churches. The Church of South India arose out of a  merger of the southern province of the Church of India, Pakistan, Burma and Ceylon (Anglican), the Methodist Church of South India and the South India United Church (a Congregationalist, Reformed and Presbyterian united church) in 1947. In the 1990s a small number of Baptist and Pentecostal churches joined also the union. 

In 1970 the Church of India, Pakistan, Burma and Ceylon, the United Church of North India, the Baptist Churches of Northern India, the Church of the Brethren in India, the Methodist Church (British and Australia Conferences) and the Disciples of Christ denominations merged to form the Church of North India. Also in 1970 the Anglicans, Presbyterians (Church of Scotland), United Methodists and Lutherans of Churches in Pakistan merged into the Church of Pakistan. The Church of Bangladesh is the result of a merge of Anglican and Presbyterian churches.

Britain and Ireland
In the 1960s the Methodist Church of Great Britain made ecumenical overtures to the Church of England, aimed at church unity. These formally failed when they were rejected by the Church of England's General Synod in 1972. In 1981, a covenant project was proposed between the Church of England, the Methodist Church in Great Britain, the United Reformed Church and the Moravian Church.

In 1982 the United Reformed Church voted in favour of the covenant, which would have meant remodelling its elders and moderators as bishops and incorporating its ministry into the apostolic succession. The Church of England rejected the covenant. Conversations and co-operation continued leading in 2003 to the signing of a covenant between the Church of England and the Methodist Church of Great Britain. From the 1970s onward, the Methodist Church was involved in several "Local Ecumenical Projects" (LEPs) with neighbouring denominations usually with the Church of England, the Baptists or with the United Reformed Church, which involved sharing churches, schools and in some cases ministers.

In the Church of England, Anglo-Catholics are often opposed to unity with Protestants, which can reduce hope of unity with the Roman Catholic Church. Accepting women Protestant ministers would also make unity with the See of Rome more difficult.

In the 1990s and early 2000s the Scottish Episcopal Church (Anglican), the Church of Scotland (Presbyterian), the Methodist Church of Great Britain and the United Reformed Church were all parts of the  "Scottish Churches Initiative for Union" (SCIFU) for seeking greater unity. The attempt stalled following the withdrawal of the Church of Scotland in 2003.

In 2002 the Church of Ireland, which is generally on the low church end of the spectrum of world Anglicanism, signed a covenant for greater cooperation and potential ultimate unity with the Methodist Church in Ireland.

Church of England

Notable parishes 

See also List of conservative evangelical Anglican churches in England

 All Saints Church, Peckham
 All Saints Church, Ecclesall, Sheffield
 All Souls Church, Langham Place
 Busbridge Church, Surrey
Christ Church, Walshaw, Bury
 Hambledon Church, Surrey
 Holy Trinity Brompton
 Holy Trinity Church, Cambridge
 Jesmond Parish Church
 St Ebbe's Church, Oxford
 St Helen's Bishopsgate
 St Matthew's Church, Millbrook, Jersey
 St Mark's Church, Kennington
 St Martin in the Bull Ring, Birmingham
 St Mary's Church, Islington
 St Nicolas Church, Newbury

Notable organisations 
 Alpha course
 Anglican Mainstream
 Christianity Explored
 Church Army
 Church Society
 Crosslinks
 Reform (Anglican)

Notable theological colleges 
 Oak Hill Theological College, Southgate, London
 Ridley Hall, Cambridge
 St John's College, Durham
 St John's College, Nottingham
 Trinity College, Bristol
 Wycliffe Hall, Oxford
 Moore College, Sydney
 Ridley College, Melbourne

Notable churches and dioceses 
 Anglican Episcopal Church
 Anglican Orthodox Church and the formerly Traditional Protestant Episcopal Church
 Anglican Diocese of Sydney
 Anglican Diocese of Tasmania
 Anglican Diocese of North West Australia
 Anglican Diocese of Armidale
 Free Church of England
 Church of Ireland
 Church of England (Continuing)
 Extra-provincial Anglican churches
 Church of England in South Africa
 Church of South India
 Church of North India
 Diocese of the Great Lakes
 Diocese of the Carolinas
 Reformed Episcopal Church
 Reformed Anglican Church (USA)
 United Episcopal Church of North America

See also 
 Anglo-Catholicism
 Broad church
 Central churchmanship
 Conservative Evangelicalism in Britain
 Church of England
Church of England (Continuing)
Evangelical Anglicanism
 High Church
 Open Evangelical
Provincial episcopal visitor
 Ritualism

References

Further reading
Cross, F. L. (ed.) (1957) The Oxford Dictionary of the Christian Church. London: Oxford U. P.; Low Churchmen, p. 824

External links
 Catholic Encyclopedia: Low Church
High Church vs. Low Church: Documentary Narrative of an Ecclesiastical Joke compiled by Richard Mammana and Cynthia McFarland for Anglicans Online
Igreja Anglicana Reformada do Brasil 

Anglican Churchmanship
Protestantism-related controversies
Christian terminology
Evangelical Anglicanism
Evangelicalism in the Church of England